Yelena Kruglova (born March 22, 1962) is a former Soviet swimmer.  She was a member of the team that won the 1980 Olympic bronze medal in the 4 × 100 m medley relay and bronze medal in the 4 × 100 m medley relay at World Championships in West Berlin, 1978.

In 1982 she married Olympic Champion Aleksandr Sidorenko.

She was awarded the Medal "For Distinguished Labour" (USSR).

References
databaseOlympics

Swimmers at the 1980 Summer Olympics
Olympic swimmers of the Soviet Union
Olympic bronze medalists for the Soviet Union
Soviet female swimmers
1962 births
Living people
Olympic bronze medalists in swimming
Russian female swimmers
Ukrainian female swimmers
World Aquatics Championships medalists in swimming
Female backstroke swimmers
Medalists at the 1980 Summer Olympics
Sportspeople from Ivanovo